Fivemile Creek is a stream in the U.S. state of Georgia. It is a tributary to the Altamaha River.

A variant name is "Five Mile Creek".

References

Rivers of Georgia (U.S. state)
Rivers of Appling County, Georgia
Rivers of Wayne County, Georgia